Adidja Nzeyimana is a Burundian footballer who plays as a goalkeeper for PVP Buyenzi and Burundi women's national team.

Club career 
Nzeyimana has played for PVP Buyenzi in Burundi. She partook in the 2021 CAF Women's Champions League CECAFA Qualifiers between August 2021 and September 2021. She was the first choice goalkeeper during the competition.

International career 
Nzeyimana was part of the Burundi U20 squad in 2017. She was earned call ups into the squad for their 2018 African U-20 Women's World Cup Qualifying Tournament matches against South Africa. Nzeyimana kept the post in both their matches for the 2022 Africa Women Cup of Nations qualifiers of which they defeated Djibouti 11–1 on aggregate to qualify for their first Africa Women Cup of Nations.

References

External links 
 

Living people
Burundian women's footballers
Women's association football goalkeepers
Burundi women's international footballers
Year of birth missing (living people)